IIS may refer to:

Organizations
 Indian Information Service, of the Government of India
 Institute of Information Scientists, a professional association now merged into the Chartered Institute of Library and Information Professionals, UK
 Institute of Ismaili Studies, in London, England
 Iraqi Intelligence Service, the main state intelligence organization in Iraq under Saddam Hussein.

Technology
 Immunization information system, an information system that collects vaccination data
 Improved iterative scaling, an algorithm in statistics
 Internet Information Services, Microsoft web server software

Other uses
 Nissan Island Airport, Papua New Guinea, IATA airport code IIS
 IIS, a ship prefix for ships of the Imperial Iranian Navy
 IIS, shorthand for sestertius, an ancient Roman coin
 Insulin/IGF-1 signalling pathway, signaling intracellular mechanism involved in longevity of organisms

See also

ISS (disambiguation)
 I²S, an electrical serial bus interface standard